The 1997–98 season was the 101st season of competitive football in Scotland. Celtic won the Premier Division championship, preventing rivals Rangers from winning a record 10th successive championship.

Scottish Premier Division

Top scorers

Scottish League Division One

Table

Top scorers

Scottish League Division Two

Table

Top scorers

Scottish League Division Three

Table

Top scorers

Other honours

Cup honours

Individual honours

SPFA awards

SFWA awards

Scottish clubs in Europe

Average coefficient – 3.125

Scotland national team

Key:
(H) = Home match
(A) = Away match
WCQG4 = World Cup qualifying – Group 4
WCGA = World Cup – Group A

Notable events
After the end of the season, the 10 Premier Division clubs formed a breakaway Scottish Premier League similar to the one formed in England six years earlier.
Celtic won the Premier Division title after nine successive title wins by Rangers.
Walter Smith resigned as manager of Rangers after seven years to be succeeded by Dutchman Dick Advocaat.
Rangers lost the Scottish Cup final 2–1 to Hearts, leaving them without a major trophy for the first time since 1986.
Paul Gascoigne left Rangers in March to return to England in a £3.4million move to Middlesbrough.
Ally McCoist left Rangers after 15 years and more than 300 goals to sign for Kilmarnock on a free transfer.
Goalkeeper Andy Goram left Rangers after seven years, having just walked out of the Scotland squad for the World Cup in France.
Also leaving Rangers after seven years was Stuart McCall, who moved to England and signed for Bradford City.
After signing from Perugia in a £3.5million deal at the start of the season, Italian striker Marco Negri had a dream start to his career at Rangers – scoring 23 goals in his first 10 league games. However, after playing 27 league games and scoring 32 goals, his season was ended by a serious eye injury off the field in March.
Brian Laudrup ended his four-year spell with Rangers and signed for Chelsea at the end of the season.

Notes and references

 
Seasons in Scottish football